Judson Augusto do Bonfim Santos, known as just Judson, is a professional football player. Born in Brazil, he represents the Equatorial Guinea national team.

In October 2012, he represented Equatorial Guinea in a 2013 Africa Cup of Nations qualification game versus Democratic Republic of the Congo. He scored on his international debut in a 2-1 victory over the Congolese side.

International career

International goals
Scores and results list Equatorial Guinea's goal tally first.

References

External links

1992 births
Living people
Association football midfielders
Equatoguinean footballers
Equatorial Guinea international footballers
Brazilian footballers
Sportspeople from Salvador, Bahia
Campeonato Brasileiro Série C players
Boa Esporte Clube players
Esporte Clube São Bento players
Campeonato Brasileiro Série D players
Itumbiara Esporte Clube players

São Bernardo Futebol Clube players
Naturalized citizens of Equatorial Guinea